Who Let the Cats Out? is an album by Mike Stern, released in 2006 through Heads Up International. The album reached a peak position of number fourteen on Billboard Top Jazz Albums chart.

Track listing

References

2006 albums
Mike Stern albums
Heads Up International albums